Der Wecker was a Yiddish-language socialist newspaper, published in Iaşi, Romania, from May to September 1896. It was published by a socialist propaganda group, which also brought out Lumina. In September 1896, the publication of Der Wecker was discontinued due to financial constraints.

See also
History of the Jews in Iași

References

1896 establishments in Romania
1896 disestablishments in Romania
Defunct newspapers published in Romania
Jews and Judaism in Iași
Mass media in Iași
Newspapers published in Iași
Publications established in 1896
Publications disestablished in 1896
Socialism in Romania
Yiddish socialist newspapers
Yiddish culture in Romania